Paul Vincent Napier (March 10, 1930 – February 21, 2015) was an American actor. He had small roles in multiple television series, but was known mostly for his roles in over 400 advertisements, especially for General Motors' Certified Service program.

Biography
Napier was born in Rochester, New York. He attended the Aquinas Institute and later graduated from Cornell University. Before his acting career, he worked for the Rochester Americans hockey team as promotions director and was the sports announcer for WBBF. He moved to California in 1960. Napier began serving the Screen Actors Guild (SAG) as a board member in 1979, and helped establish the Screen Actors Guild Awards show first held in 1995. He was named the 2010 recipient of SAG Hollywood's Ralph Morgan Award.   Napier coached high school sports around Los Angeles schools during his acting career for over 50 years. Napier died in 2015 and was posthumously honored with the Aquinas Institute's Distinguished Alumnus Award that year.

Filmography

References

External links

1930 births
2015 deaths
Male actors from Rochester, New York
Cornell University alumni
American male television actors
American male film actors